Brinkmanniidae is a family of worms belonging to the order Polystilifera.

Genera:
 Brinkmannia Stiasny-Wijnhoff, 1926

References

Polystilifera
Nemertea families